John F. Revolta (April 5, 1911 – March 3, 1991) was an American professional golfer who played on the PGA Tour in the 1930s, 1940s, and early 1950s. He won a major title, the 1935 PGA Championship, and had 18 career wins on tour.

Born in St. Louis, Missouri, Revolta's family relocated to Oshkosh, Wisconsin in 1923 when he was twelve. He learned the game as a caddie at the public course in Oshkosh and won the state caddie championship at age 14. Like most professional golfers of his generation, Revolta started out as a club professional. He worked at Swan Lake Country Club in Portage in 1930, Chippewa Elks Golf Club in 1931, Riverside Country Club in Menominee, Michigan 1932–1933, and Tripoli Country Club in Milwaukee from 1934–1936. He won the Wisconsin State Open four times in a six-year period; he was not eligible for two years while working in Michigan. Revolta was a member of the PGA Tour from 1935–1952.

Revolta's best year as a tour pro was 1935, when he won five tournaments and led the PGA Tour's money list. He defeated Tommy Armour 5 & 4 in the PGA Championship held at Twin Hills Golf & Country Club and also won the Western Open, the era's "fifth major."  He also played in the Ryder Cup in 1935 and 1937.

Revolta was known as the "Iron Master" because of his outstanding short game. Regarding his bunker play in particular, short game master Paul Runyan said Revolta "led the class [of outstanding bunker players] by a big margin. His skill from sand simply left me aghast." His instruction book, Johnny Revolta's Short Cuts to Better Golf, first published in 1949, is still in print today.

Revolta was the head professional at Evanston Golf Club in Skokie, Illinois, from 1935 to 1966, and continued to teach there during summers into the late 1980s. He died in Palm Springs, California in 1991, a month shy of his 80th birthday.

Professional wins (29)

PGA Tour wins (18)
1933 (1) Miami Open
1934 (2) St. Paul Open, Wisconsin Open
1935 (5) Western Open, Sarasota Open, Wisconsin Open, PGA Championship, Inverness Invitational Four-Ball (with Henry Picard)
1936 (1) Thomasville Open
1937 (2) Miami Biltmore Open, Miami International Four-Ball (with Henry Picard)
1938 (4) Sacramento Open, St. Petersburg Open, St. Paul Open, Columbia Open
1939 (1) Inverness Invitational Four-Ball (with Henry Picard)
1941 (1) San Francisco National Match Play Open
1944 (1) Texas Open

Major championship is shown in bold.

Other wins (11)
this list is probably incomplete
1930 Wisconsin State Open
1931 Wisconsin State Open
1935 Miami International Four-Ball (with Henry Picard)
1936 Waterloo Open Golf Classic, Miami International Four-Ball (with Henry Picard), Illinois PGA Championship
1937 Illinois PGA Championship
1938 Illinois PGA Championship
1941 Illinois PGA Championship
1944 Pro-Lady Victory National (with Patty Berg)
1947 Illinois PGA Championship

Major championships

Wins (1)

Note: The PGA Championship was match play until 1958

Results timeline

NYF = tournament not yet founded
NT = no tournament
WD = withdrew
CUT = missed the half-way cut
R64, R32, R16, QF, SF, F = round in which player lost in PGA Championship match play
"T" indicates a tie for a place

Summary

Most consecutive cuts made – 24 (1933 U.S. Open – 1940 PGA)
Longest streak of top-10s – 2 (1934 U.S. Open – 1934 PGA)

See also
List of golfers with most PGA Tour wins
List of men's major championships winning golfers

References

External links

American male golfers
PGA Tour golfers
Ryder Cup competitors for the United States
Winners of men's major golf championships
Golf writers and broadcasters
Golfers from St. Louis
American people of Italian descent
1911 births
1991 deaths